In enzymology, a tyramine N-feruloyltransferase is an enzyme that catalyzes the chemical reaction

feruloyl-CoA + tyramine  CoA + N-feruloyltyramine

Thus, the two substrates of this enzyme are feruloyl-CoA and tyramine, whereas its two products are CoA and N-feruloyltyramine.

This enzyme belongs to the family of transferases, specifically those acyltransferases transferring groups other than aminoacyl groups.  The systematic name of this enzyme class is feruloyl-CoA:tyramine N-(hydroxycinnamoyl)transferase. Other names in common use include tyramine N-feruloyl-CoA transferase, feruloyltyramine synthase, feruloyl-CoA tyramine N-feruloyl-CoA transferase, and tyramine feruloyltransferase.

References

 

EC 2.3.1
Enzymes of unknown structure